The Kopnück is a hill, in the northern Ahr Hills, a region within the Eifel Mountains in Germany. It rises near the village of Kop Nück in the borough of Bad Münstereifel in the German state of North Rhine-Westphalia.

References 

Mountains and hills of the Eifel
Mountains and hills of North Rhine-Westphalia
Euskirchen (district)